Craig Road may refer to:
Craig Road (Singapore)
Craig Road (Las Vegas)
Chemin Craig, historical road in Quebec